The results of the 2007 Little League World Series were determined between August 17 and August 26, 2007 in South Williamsport, Pennsylvania. 16 teams were divided into four groups, two with four teams from the United States and two with four international teams each, playing in a round robin format. In each group, the top two teams advanced to the knockout stage. The last remaining team from the United States faced the last remaining international team for the Little League World Series Championship.

Pool play

Pool A

Massachusetts 3, Ohio 2

Georgia 9, Oregon 4

Ohio 10, Georgia 2

Oregon 1, Massachusetts 0

Oregon 6, Ohio 1

Georgia 8, Massachusetts 1

Pool B

Arizona 16, Maryland 6

Texas 6, Minnesota 0

Texas 5, Arizona 1

Minnesota 4, Maryland 3

Texas vs. Maryland
This game was canceled due to rain to permit other games to be rescheduled. The result of this game would have had no effect on pool standings. However, the game was counted for determining pitching eligibility.

Arizona 9, Minnesota 2

Pool C

Japan 10, Curaçao 3

Canada 13, Saudi Arabia 5

Curaçao 2, Saudi Arabia 0

Japan 7, Canada 1

Japan vs. Saudi Arabia
This game was canceled due to rain to permit other games to be rescheduled. The result of this game would have had no effect on pool standings. However, the game was counted for determining pitching eligibility.

Curaçao 6, Canada 2

Pool D

Venezuela 2, Taiwan 1

Mexico 11, Netherlands 1

Taiwan 11, Netherlands 1

Venezuela 21, Netherlands 2

Taiwan 4, Mexico 2

Venezuela 11, Mexico 1

Elimination round

Semifinals

Curaçao 4, Venezuela 2

Texas 8, Oregon 2

Japan 4, Taiwan 3

Georgia 16, Arizona 6

Finals

Japan 7, Curaçao 4

Georgia 5, Texas 2

Consolation Game

Texas 1, Curaçao 0

Championship Game

Georgia  3, Japan 2

External links
Full schedule from littleleague.org

2007 Little League World Series